Spania GTA is an automobile design and manufacturing company based in Valencia, Spain. It was founded by Domingo Ochoa, who is also the current CEO of the company.

They have designed, developed and produced the GTA Spano in-house. The first production units were delivered to the customers in 2012, with full scale production expected in 2013.

References

Sports car manufacturers
Car manufacturers of Spain
Car brands